Euomphalia strigella is a species of air-breathing land snail, a terrestrial pulmonate gastropod mollusk in the family Hygromiidae, the hairy snails and their allies.

Subspecies
 Euomphalia strigella mehadiae (Bourguignat, 1881)
 Euomphalia strigella ruscinica (Bourguignat, 1881)
 Euomphalia strigella strigella (Draparnaud, 1801)

Distribution 

This species is known to occur in:
 Ukraine

References

 Bank, R. A.; Neubert, E. (2017). Checklist of the land and freshwater Gastropoda of Europe. Last update: 16 July 2017
 Sysoev, A. V. & Schileyko, A. A. (2009). Land snails and slugs of Russia and adjacent countries. Sofia/Moskva (Pensoft). 312 pp., 142 plates.

Hygromiidae
Molluscs of Europe
Gastropods described in 1801